A structural drawing, a type of engineering drawing, is a plan or set of plans and details for how a building or other structure will be built. Structural drawings are generally prepared by registered professional engineers, and based on information provided by architectural drawings. The structural drawings are primarily concerned with the load-carrying members of a structure. They outline the size and types of materials to be used, as well as the general demands for connections. They do not address architectural details like surface finishes, partition walls, or mechanical systems. The structural drawings communicate the design of the building's structure to the building authority for review. Structural drawings are also included with a proposed building's contract documents, which guide contractors in detailing, fabricating, and installing parts of the structure.

The structural drawings set has different subsets: General Notes, Plans, Elevations, Sections, and Details

General Notes are part of structural drawings and they cover the codes used in design and the by-laws of the building. Typically there are no details on these drawings. Structural notes provide information regarding general material properties (steel or wood grade, concrete strength, etc)  or construction requirements (soil compaction, weld procedures, etc). The structural notes also provide information about design criteria (gravity , seismic, and wind loading). 

The structural plan drawings show the foundation, floor, and roof plan of the building. These plans provide information like size and location of the structural elements present in the respective plans. 

Elevations show the exterior walls of a building or structure. In elevation drawings you can find the height of building (floors and roof elevations) and structural properties of elements present in the walls and that cannot be seen in plan drawings. 

Sections plans are referenced in the plan view drawings and provide information about elements that cannot be see in plan drawings. The sections usually are cut through walls or structural elements that are not typical and the constructor needs to be aware off.

The details drawings provide particular information on how to construct or connect the structural elements. The details can be reference in plans, elevations and sections.

See also 
 Architectural drawing
 Working drawing
 Engineering drawing

References

Technical drawing